Tour du Limousin is a 4-day road bicycle race held annually in Limousin, France. It was first held in 1968 and since 2005 it has been organised as a 2.1 event on the UCI Europe Tour. In 2011 it was upgraded to an 2.HC event, and downgraded to 2.1 since 2013. Between 1968 and 1974 it was an amateur race.

Winners

External links
 
 English section of the official site

UCI Europe Tour races
Recurring sporting events established in 1968
1968 establishments in France
Cycle races in France